Saint-Martin-de-Landelles is a former commune in the Manche department in Normandy in north-western France. On 1 January 2016, it was merged into the commune of Saint-Hilaire-du-Harcouët. Its population was 1,126 in 2019.

See also
Communes of the Manche department

References

Saintmartindelandelles